Narinder Batth is an Indian lyricist of Punjabi music. His first hit was Jassi Gill's single "Lancer" in 2013.

Background
Batth was born in a small village, Batthan Kalan, Punjab, India. His father was a farmer and Batth also started farming after completing his studies.

Career
Batth made his debut with "Prem Kahani", which was sung by his friend, Harry Mirza. He wrote lyrics for other songs before "Lancer" became a hit. Subsequently, he wrote lyrics for many singers including Geeta Zaildar, Jassi Sohal, Kaur B, Rupinder Handa, Babbal Rai, Pardeep Jeed Kulbir Jhijher, and Dilpreet Dhillon among others.

Songwriting discography
9-9 Chooriya - Kirandeep kaur
Lancer - Jassie Gill (2013)
Degree - Geeta Zaildar
Teri Kamli - Goldy ( Desi Crew )
Sunroof - Eknoor Sidhu
Wang - Dilpreet Dhillon
Pagg - Dilpreet Dhillon
Gulaab - Dilpreet Dhillon ft. Goldy (Desi Crew)
Mundeya De Hostel
Muchh - Dilpreet Dhillon
Jump 2 Bhangraaa - Babbal Rai
Kafila - Aiesle
House Wife - Vicky Vik
Yaar Jatt De - Jassie Gill, Babbal Rai
Jetha Putt - Goldy Desi Crew
Befikre - Dilpreet Dhillon
Pagg - Dilpreet Dhillon, Goldy Desi Crew
Yarran Da Group - Dilpreet Dhillon
Kirpana - Kulbir Jhinjer [Narinder Batth]
Raah Jandi - Dilpreet Dhillon
Teri Wait - Kaur B
Munde Pindaan De - Goldy Desi Crew, Honey Uppal
Roadways - Parry Singh
Gulaab - Samraat
Mundeya De Hostel - Inder Kaur
Sp De Rank Wargi - Nimrat Khaira
Hostel - Inder Kaur [Narinder Batth]
Different Nature (Wakhra Subha) - Monty, Waris
Deor Bharjayii - Babbal Rai
Kasoor - Manna Dharwad
Daaru (Aah Chak 2016) - Kamal Grewal
Teri Yaari - Roshan Prince
Gallan Goriyan - Roshan Prince 
Lakdi Da Ford - Roshan Prince 
Villain Jatti - Roshan Prince 
Clipp (iTunes) - Gagan Deep Sandhu
Gulab (Original) - Dilpreet Dhillon, Goldy Kahlon
Clipp - Gagandeep Sandhu
Chaska - Harry Mirza
Honsla - Jassi Sohal
Zindgi - Dilpreet Dhillon
Swag Jatti Da (iTunes) - Rishi Dhillon
Swag Jatti Da - Rishi Dhillon [Narinder Batth]
Town (iTunes) - Jot Harjot
Pind De Gerhe - Rupinder Handa
302 (Fire) - Geeta Zaildar
Bad Joke 
Yarrian (LokThat) - Babbal Rai
Satrangi Titli - Jass Bajwa, Desi Crew
Rail Gaddi (iTunes) - Pardeep Need
Skin tone - Arry Sidhu / Gurlez Akhtar
Change - Gurneet Dosanjh
Time - Gurjaan Heer
Hukam da Yakka - Gippy Grewal
Khajuri Gutt - Sarika Gill
Jatt Te Jawani - Dilpreet Dhillon, Karan Aujla
Note mukabla - goldy desi crew / Gurlez Akhtar

References

Indian lyricists
Indian male songwriters
Indian musicians
Punjabi-language lyricists